Scorpaenoidei is a suborder of ray-finned fishes, part of the order Scorpaeniformes, that includes the scorpionfishes, lionfishes and velvetfishes. This suborder is at its most diverse in the Pacific and Indian Oceans but is also found in the Atlantic Ocean.

Taxonomy
Scorpaenoidei was first named as a suborder in 1899 by the American ichthyologist Samuel Garman as a suborder of the Perciformes. Some authorities still treat the suborder as being part of the Perciformes but the 5th Edition of Fishes of the World recognises the Scorpaeniformes as a valid order and places this suborder within it. The subfamilies of the family Scorpaenidae are treated as families by some authors. It has been argued by some authors that the suborder is paraphyletic and that a more correct classification is that the grouping, with some differences, be placed on the superfamily Scorpaenoidea.

Families and subfamilies
The suborder Scorpaenoidei is classified into families and subfamilies in the 5th Edition of Fishes of the World as follows:

Suborder Scorpaenoidei
 Family Scorpaenidae Risso, 1827 (Scorpionfishes)
 Subfamily Sebastinae Kaup, 1873 (Rockfishes)
 Tribe Sebastini Kaup, 1873
 Tribe Sebastolobini Matsubara, 1943
 Subfamily Setarchinae Matsubara, 1943
 Subfamily Neosebastinae Matsubara, 1943
 Subfamily Scorpaeninae Risso, 1927 (Scorpionfishes and lionfishes)
 Tribe Scorpaenini Risso, 1927
 Tribe Pteroini Kaup, 1873
 Subfamily Caracanthinae Gill, 1885 (Orbicular velvetfishes or coral crouchers)
 Subfamily Apistinae Gill, 1859 (Wasp scorpionfishes)
 Subfamily Tetraroginae J.L.B. Smith, 1949 (Sailback scorpionfishes or wasp fishes)
 Subfamily Synanceiinae Swainson, 1839 (Stonefishes)
 Tribe Minoini Jordan & Starks, 1904
 Tribe Choridactylini Kaup, 1859
 Tribe Synanceiini Swainson 1839
 Subfamily Plectrogeniinae Fowler, 1938
 Family Aploactinidae Jordan & Starks, 1904 (Velvetfishes)
 Family Eschmeyeridae  Mandrytsa, 2001 (the cofish)
 Family Pataecidae Gill, 1872 (Australian prowlfishes)
 Family Gnathanacanthidae Gill, 1892 (Red velvetfish)
 Family Congiopodidae Gill, 1889 (Racehorses, pigfishes or horsefishes)

Characteristics
Scorpaenoidei is rather varied grouping of around 470 species of moderately-sized fishes which have 24 to 44 vertebrae and the ribs towards the head are either absent or rigidly attached to the spine.

Distribution and habitat
Scorpaenoidei are found in all the tropical and temperate oceans of the world but most species are found in the Indian and Pacific Oceans. The suborder includes benthic and pelagic species and marine and freshwater species.

Venom
Scorpaenoidei contaiuns some of the most venomous fish species known, including lionfishes, stonefishes and scorpionfishes.

References

Scorpaeniformes
Taxa named by Samuel Garman
Ray-finned fish suborders